IDSS can mean:
 Institute for Defence and Strategic Studies
 Intelligent decision support systems
 International Docking System Standard, for spacecraft